Miloš Šakota (born 11 June 1984) is a Greek–Serbian professional basketball coach and former player who is the U-16 head coach for the Crvena zvezda youth system.

Playing career
Šakota played for Ionikos NF, Near East, Aigaleo, Apollon Limassol (Cyprus), CSKA Sofia (Bulgaria), Al Nizwa (Oman), Olympias Patras, Arkadikos, and AE Livadia during his playing career. He played in the European-wide 2nd-tier level EuroCup, during the 2003–04 season, with Ionikos NF. He retired as a player with Livadia in 2015, to pursuit a coaching career.

In October 2016, Šakota returned from the retirement and signed for AE Santorinis. On 31 July 2017, he signed for Lokros Atalantis. In 2018, Šakota joined a roster Slodes of the Second Basketball League of Serbia, upon an invitation of Nenad Mišanović. For the second time, he retired as a player in 2020.

Coaching career
Šakota has a stint in 2015 when the Greek League club AEK hired him as an assistant coach, joining the coaching staff of his father Dragan Šakota.

After second retirement in 2020, Šakota joined the Slodes staff as an assistant coach. Afterwards, he joined a youth system of Žitko Basket as the U19 head coach.

On 17 August 2022, Crvena zvezda hired Šakota as their new head coach for the under-16 team.

Personal life
Šakota is a son of Dragan Šakota, a professional basketball coach and former player, and the older brother of Dušan Šakota, a retired Greek professional basketball player. His father Dragan is a FIBA Saporta Cup champion in 1991 and FIBA Champions League champion in 2018. His brother Dušan is a two-time EuroLeague champion, winning both titles with Panathinaikos, in 2007 and 2009.

References

External links
Player Profile at proballers.com
Player Profile at eurobasket.com
Player Profile at realgm.com
Player Profile at euroleaguebasketball.net

1984 births
Living people
Apollon Limassol BC players
Arkadikos B.C. players
Aigaleo B.C. players
Basketball players from Belgrade
BC CSKA Sofia players
Greek expatriate basketball people in Cyprus
Greek expatriate basketball people in Serbia
Greek basketball coaches
Greek men's basketball players
Greek Basket League players
Greek people of Serbian descent
Ionikos N.F. B.C. players
Naturalized citizens of Greece
KK Slodes players
KK Crvena zvezda youth coaches
Near East B.C. players
Olympias Patras B.C. players
Power forwards (basketball)
Serbian men's basketball coaches
Serbian men's basketball players
Serbian expatriate basketball people in Cyprus
Serbian expatriate basketball people in Greece
Serbian expatriate basketball people in Bulgaria
Serbian expatriate basketball people in Oman
Small forwards